The 2019 Presbyterian Blue Hose football team represented Presbyterian College in the 2019 NCAA Division I FCS football season. They were led by third-year head coach Tommy Spangler, in his second stint as PC head coach, as he coached the Blue Hose from 2001–06. The Blue Hose played their home games at Bailey Memorial Stadium in their 13th and final season as members of the Big South Conference. They finished the season 2–10, 1–5 in Big South play to finish in a three-way tie for fifth place.

PC announced in 2017 that it had started a transition to non-scholarship football. After the 2019 season, PC will leave Big South football, though remaining a conference member in other sports. The Blue Hose will play the 2020 football season as an FCS independent, and will join the Pioneer Football League, a single-sport conference whose members do not award football scholarships, in 2021.

Previous season
The Blue Hose finished the 2018 season 2–8, 0–5 in Big South play to finish in last place.

Preseason

Big South poll
In the Big South preseason poll released on July 21, 2019, the Blue Hose were predicted to finish in seventh place.

Preseason All–Big South team
The Blue Hose had two players selected to the preseason all-Big South team.

Offense

Keith Pearson – WR

Defense

Colby Campbell – LB

Schedule

Game summaries

Mercer

Jacksonville

Eastern Kentucky

at North Alabama

at Campbell

at Monmouth

Kennesaw State

at Merrimack

at Hampton

Gardner–Webb

Charleston Southern

St. Andrews

References

Presbyterian
Presbyterian Blue Hose football seasons
Presbyterian Blue Hose football